The General Electric J97 is a single-shaft turbojet engine designed and built by General Electric as a compact high-performance engine for light attack fighters and eventually a number of drone projects.

Development and design
The J97 was based on GE's General Electric GE1/J1 series of turbojets and the engine development was financed by the United States Air Force. The original application was to be the Northrop P-530 (which later evolved into the YF-17), but it was ultimately only used in several small drone aircraft.

Variants
J97-GE-100
Standard Variant
J97-GE-17

Applications

 Boeing YQM-94 B-Gull (Compass Cope B)
 Ryan AQM-91 Firefly

Specifications (J97-GE-100)

See also

References

1960s turbojet engines
J97
Abandoned military aircraft engine projects of the United States